Vilma Medgyaszay (1885–1972) was a Hungarian actress and threatre director.

'Medgyaszay is responsible for the popularizing of melodized poems by Hungarian poet Endre Ady. From 1913 to 1915, Medgyaszay operated the theatre that is currently the Budapest Puppet Theatre, naming it Medgyaszay Cabaret and singing folk songs on stage. She had a role in the 1938 film Rézi Friday and the 1941 film Háry János.

References

1885 births
1972 deaths
Hungarian theatre directors